Justin McGrath can refer to:

 Justin McGrath (Plup), American Super Smash Bros. Melee player
 Justin McGrath (footballer), Australian rules footballer